French exhibits perhaps the most extensive phonetic changes (from Latin) of any of the Romance languages. Similar changes are seen in some of the northern Italian regional languages, such as Lombard or Ligurian. Most other Romance languages are significantly more conservative phonetically, with Spanish, Italian, and especially Sardinian showing the most conservatism, and Portuguese, Occitan, Catalan, and Romanian showing moderate conservatism.

French also shows enormous phonetic changes between the Old French period and the modern language. Spelling, however, has barely changed, which accounts for the wide differences between current spelling and pronunciation. Some of the most profound changes have been:

The loss of almost all final consonants.
The occasional elision of final , which caused many newly-final consonants.
The loss of the formerly strong stress that had characterized the language throughout much of its history and triggered many of the phonetic changes.
Significant transformations in the pronunciation of vowels, especially nasal vowels.

Only some of the changes are reflected in the orthography, which generally corresponds to the pronunciation of c. 1100–1200 CE (the Old French period) rather than modern pronunciation.

This page documents the phonological history of French from a relatively technical standpoint. See also History of French#Internal history for a less technical introduction.

Overview

A profound change in very late spoken Latin (Vulgar Latin, the forerunner of all the Romance languages) was the restructuring of the vowel system of Classical Latin. Latin had thirteen distinct vowels: ten pure vowels (long and short versions of a, e, i, o, u), and three diphthongs (ae, oe, au). What happened to Vulgar Latin is set forth in the table.

Essentially, the ten pure vowels were reduced to the seven vowels , and vowel length was no longer a distinguishing feature. Au was retained, but various languages (including Old French) eventually turned it into  after the original  fell victim to further changes.

The complex but regular French sound changes have caused irregularities in the conjugation of Old French verbs, like stressed stems caused by historic diphthongization (amer, aim, aimes, aime, aiment, but amons, amez), or regular loss of certain phonemes (vivre, vif, vis, vit). Later in Modern French, these changes were limited to fewer irregular verbs. Modern French also had lost the class of rather unpredictable -ier verbs (resulting from ejection of /j/ into the infinitive suffix -āre, which still exists in some langues d'oïl), having been replaced by simple -er verbs plus -i instead, as in manier, but Old French laissier → laisser.

Vowel length became automatically determined by syllable structure, with stressed open syllables having long vowels and other syllables having short vowels. Furthermore, the stress on accented syllables became more pronounced in Vulgar Latin than in Classical Latin. That tended to cause unaccented syllables to become less distinct, while working further changes on the sounds of the accented syllables. That especially applied to the new long vowels, many of which broke into diphthongs but with different results in each daughter language.

Old French underwent more thorough alterations of its sound system than did the other Romance languages. Vowel breaking is observed to some extent in Spanish and Italian: Vulgar Latin focu(s) "fire" (in Classical Latin, "hearth") becomes Italian fuoco and Spanish fuego. In Old French, it went even further than in any other Romance language; of the seven vowels inherited from Vulgar Latin, only  remained unchanged in stressed open syllables:

 The sound of Latin short o > Proto-Romance  > OF uo, later ue: cor > cuor > cuer, "heart"
 Latin long ē and short i > Proto-Romance  > OF ei: habēre > aveir, "to have"; this later becomes  in many words, as in avoir
 Latin long ō and short u > Proto-Romance  > OF ou, later eu: flōrem > flour, "flower"
That change also characterizes the Gallo-Italic languages of Northern Italy (cf. Bolognese ).

Furthermore, all instances of Latin long ū > Proto-Romance  became , the lip-rounded sound that is written u in Modern French. That occurred in both stressed and unstressed syllables, regardless of whether open or closed.

Latin au must have been retained at the time such changes were affecting Proto-Romance.

Changes affecting consonants were also quite pervasive in Old French. Old French shared with the rest of the Vulgar Latin world the loss of final -M. Old French also dropped many internal consonants when they followed the strongly stressed syllable; Latin petram > Proto-Romance  > OF pierre; cf. Spanish piedra ("stone").

In some contexts,  became , still written oi in Modern French. It later shifted to become rising, before becoming . The doublet of français and François in modern French orthography demonstrates the mix of dialectal features.

At some point during the Old French period, vowels with a following nasal consonant began to be nasalized. While the process of losing the final nasal consonant took place after the Old French period, the nasal vowels that characterize Modern French appeared during the period in question.

Table of vowel outcomes
The following table shows the most important modern outcomes of Vulgar Latin vowels, starting from the seven-vowel system of Proto-Western Romance stressed syllables: .  The vowels developed differently in different contexts, with the most important contexts being:
 "Open" syllables (followed by at most one consonant), where most of the vowels were diphthongized or otherwise modified.
 Syllables followed by a palatal consonant. An  usually appeared before the palatal consonant, producing a diphthong, which subsequently evolved in complex ways.
 Syllables preceded by a palatal consonant.  An  appeared after the palatal consonant, producing a rising diphthong.  The palatal consonant could arise in any of the ways just described.  In addition, it could stem from an earlier  brought into contact with a following consonant by loss of the intervening vowel: e.g. medietātem > Proto-Romance  > Gallo-Romance  (loss of unstressed vowels) > Proto-French  (palatalization) > Old French  > moitié  "half".
Nasal syllables inhibited many of the changes that otherwise happened in open syllables; instead, vowels tended to be raised. This produced significant alternations, such as masculine fin  vs. feminine fine .
 Syllables closed by  followed by another consonant.  By Old French times, this  was "debuccalized" into , which was subsequently lost, with a phonemic long vowel taking its place.  These long vowels remained for centuries, and continued to be indicated by an s, and later a circumflex, with alternations such as bette  "chard" vs. bête (formerly ) "beast" (borrowed from bēstiam).  Sometimes the length difference was accompanied by a difference in vowel quality, e.g. mal  "bad" vs. mâle  "male" (Latin māsculum < ).  Phonemic (although not phonetic) length disappeared from Parisian French by the 18th century, but survived regionally (now especially in Belgian French).
 Syllables closed by  followed by another consonant (although the sequence -lla- was not affected).
 Syllables where two or more of the above conditions occurred simultaneously, which generally evolved in complex ways.  Common examples are syllables followed by both a nasal and a palatal element (e.g. from Latin -neu-, -nea-, -nct-); open syllables preceded by a palatal (e.g. cēram "wax"); syllables both preceded and followed by a palatal (e.g. iacet "it lies"); syllables preceded by a palatal and followed by a nasal (e.g. canem "dog").

Note that the developments in unstressed syllables were both simpler and less predictable. These syllables were not subject to diphthongization and many of the other complex changes that affected stressed syllables. This produced many lexical and grammatical alternations between stressed and unstressed syllables. However, there was a strong tendency (especially beginning in the Middle French period, when the formerly strong stress accent was drastically weakened) to even out these alternations. In certain cases in verbal paradigms an unstressed variant was imported into stressed syllables, but mostly it was the other way around, with the result that in Modern French all of the numerous vowels can appear in unstressed syllables.

 "Context" refers to the syllable context at the Vulgar Latin or Gallo-Romance stage. The contexts are as follows:
 An "open" context is a stressed syllable followed by at most a single consonant at the Vulgar Latin stage.
 A "closed" context is any other syllable type (unstressed, or followed by two or more consonants).
 A "palatal" context is a stressed syllable where the preceding consonant has a palatal quality, causing a yod  to be generated after the preceding consonant, before the stressed vowel.

Changes that occurred due to contexts that developed during the Old French stage or later are indicated in the "Modern French" column. In particular, "+#" indicates a word-final context in modern French, which generally evolved due to loss of a final consonant in Old French or Middle French.

 Both  and  occur in modern French, and there are a small number of minimal pairs, e.g. jeune  "young" vs. jeûne  "fast (abstain from food)".  In general, however,  only occurs word-finally, before , and usually before , while  occurs elsewhere.

 The changes producing French moitié  were approximately as follows:
 medietātem (Classical/Late Latin form)
  (pronunciation c. 1 AD)
  (Proto-Romance form, with  >  and loss of vowel length)
  (loss of intertonic )
  (first lenition of second , but first one protected by preceding consonant )
  (lengthening of stressed vowel in open syllable)
  (Gallo-Romance loss of final unstressed )
  (second lenition)
  (final devoicing)
  (Proto-French changes in "palatal + open" context, with the long  reflecting the former open-syllable context)
  (Early Old French vowel changes)
  (Late Old French changes:  > ,  > , loss of )
  (Changes to Middle French:  > , final  > )
  (Changes to modern French:  > )

Chronological history

From Vulgar Latin through to Proto-Western Romance

Introduction of prosthetic short  before words beginning with  + consonant, becoming closed  with the Romance vowel change (Spanish espina, Modern French épine "thorn, spine" < espine < ).
Loss of final  (except in monosyllables: Modern French rien < rem).
 > .
 >  in some words (dorsum > Vulgar Latin *dossu > Modern French dos) but not others (ursum > Modern French ours).
Final  > ,  >  (Spanish cuatro, sobre < quattuor, super).
 is apparently doubled to  prior to palatalization.

To Proto-Gallo-Ibero-Romance
 and  merge, becoming  (still treated as a single sound).
That also happens in closed syllables before a palatal, often later absorbed: pēior >>  >  >> pire "worst"; noctem >  >  >>  nuit; but tertium >  >> tierz.
First lenition (did not happen in a small area around the Pyrenees): chain shift involving intervocalic or word-final consonants: voiced stops and unvoiced fricatives become voiced fricatives; unvoiced stops become voiced stops. Consonants before  are lenited, also, and  > . Final  and  when following a vowel are lenited.
First unstressed vowel loss: Loss of intertonic (unstressed and in an interior syllable) vowels except  when pretonic. That occurred at the same time as the first lenition, and individual words inconsistently show one change before the other. Hence manica > manche but grānica > grange. carricāre becomes either charchier or chargier in Old French. However, in some analyses, the standard for central French was initially for lenition to occur before the unstressed vowel apocope, and patterns of the order being reversed, resulting in voiceless consonants, were loaned from the more Frankish-influenced Northern dialects of Normandy, Champagne and Lorrain, eventually spreading to some other words by analogy, leading to known cases of divergent development, such as grange and granche, and venger and (re)vencher (the latter both from Latin vindicāre).

To Early Old French
Spread and dissolution of palatalization:
A  followed by another consonant tends to palatalize that consonant; the consonants may have been brought together by intertonic loss (medietātem >  >  > moitié, peior >  >  > pire, but impeiorāre >  >  >  > OF empoirier "to worsen").
Palatalized sounds lose their palatal quality and eject a  into the end of the preceding syllable, when open; also into the beginning of the following syllable when it is stressed, open, and front ( or ): *cugitāre >  >  >  >>  OF cuidier "to think". mansiōnātam >  >  >  > OF maisniée "household".
Double  <  and from various other combinations also ejects a preceding .
Or rather, palatal  does not eject a preceding  (otherwise, it is always absorbed even if depalatalized); palatal  emits a preceding  when depalatalized even if the preceding syllable is closed ( > * >  >  joint).
Palatal  ejects a preceding  as normal, but the  metathesizes when a  precedes, hence operārium >  >  (not ) >> ouvrier "worker".
Palatalized labials internal (in the middle of words) become palatal affricates ( and  > ;  and  > ;  > ) without emitting a preceding . This development was also seen in Occitan and Ligurian. 
(Later on,  > ,  > ,  > ; see below.)
Second unstressed vowel loss: Loss of all vowels in unstressed, final syllables, except ; addition of a final, supporting  when necessary, to avoid words with impermissible final clusters.
Second lenition: Same changes as in first lenition, applied again (not in all Gallo-Romance). Losses of unstressed vowels may have blocked that change from happening.
Palatalization of  > ,  > .
Further vocalic changes (part 1):
 >  (but >  after a palatal, and >  before nasals when not after a palatal).
 > .
Further consonant changes:
Geminate stops become single stops.
Final stops and fricatives become devoiced.
 >  unless final.
A  is inserted between palatal ,  and following  (dolēs > duels "you hurt" but colligis > * > cuelz, cueuz "you gather"; iungis > * > joinz "you join"; fīlius > filz "son": the z on such words represents ).
In first-person verb forms, they may remain palatal when final because of the influence of the palatalized subjunctives.
 >  when depalatalising but  > , without a yod. (*veclum >  >  > viel "old" but cuneum >  > coin, balneum >  > bain but montāneam >  > montagne.)
Further vocalic changes (part 2):
 > ,  > . (placēre >  > plaisir; noctem >  > nuit.)
 > , when word-final.

To Old French, c. 1100
(dēbet > Strasbourg Oaths dift  > OF doit.)
 >  (blocked by nasalization; see below).
 > , however this is blocked if a labial consonant follows, in which case the segment remains , ultimately becoming  later. (lupa > OF louve.)
 >  (blocked by nasalization; see below).
 develops allophone  before , which later develops into a separate phoneme.
Loss of  before voiced consonant (passing first through ), with lengthening of preceding vowel. That produces a new set of long vowel phonemes, as is described more completely in the following section.
 > . (This shift, along with the later  > , is an areal feature common to most Gallo-Romance languages.)
Word-final ,  >  (diurnum > EOF jorn > OF jor; vermem > EOF verm > OF ver; dormit > OF dort).

To Late Old French, c. 1250–1300
Changes here affect oral and nasal vowels alike, unless otherwise indicated.

To Middle French, c. 1500
Changes here affect oral and nasal vowels alike, unless otherwise indicated.

au  > .
ei  >  (the  diphthong is maintained in Quebec French: neige "snow"  or ).
Loss of final consonants before a word beginning with a consonant. That produces a three-way pronunciation for many words (alone, followed by a vowel, followed by a consonant), which is still maintained in the words six "six" and dix "ten" (and until recently neuf "nine"), e.g. dix  "ten" but dix amis  "ten friends" and dix femmes  "ten women".
Subject pronouns start to become mandatory because of loss of phonetic differences between inflections.
Medieval apical s, as in saint, merges into deaffricated c as in ceint, thus merging soft c and s.

To Early Modern French, c. 1700
Loss of most phonemically lengthened vowels (preserved in Belgian, Acadian French and Quebec French).
Loss of final consonants in a word standing alone. That produces a two-way pronunciation for many words (in close connection with a following word that begins with a vowel), often still maintained: nous voyons  "we see" vs. nous avons  "we have". That phenomenon is known as liaison.
The pronunciation  is preserved in some forms of Quebec and Acadian French, especially by old speakers.
Instances of /h/ were again deleted in the late seventeenth century. The phoneme /h/ had been reintroduced to the language through the absorption of loanwords, primarily of Germanic origin, in which the /h/ was preserved, and these are the /h/ instances that were lost this time around. However a Germanic h usually disallows liaison: les halles /le.al(ə)/, les haies /le.ɛ/, les haltes /le.alt(ə)/, whereas a Latin h allows liaison: les herbes /lezɛrb(ə)/, les hôtels /lezotɛl/.

To Modern French, c. 2000
 becomes a uvular sound: trill  or fricative  (the alveolar trill is maintained in Acadia, Louisiana, some parts of Québec and in Francophone Africa).
Occasional elision of final  and  elsewhere unless a sequence of three consonants would be produced (such constraints operate over multiword sequences of words that are syntactically connected). Occitan French tends to be more conservative, while the elision of final  does not occur in Francophone Africa.
Changing use of liaison, which overall becomes rarer.
In Metropolitan French, merger of  into  when word-final, but the distinction is maintained in Belgian French.

Nasalization
Progressive nasalization of vowels before  or  occurred over several hundred years, beginning with the low vowels, possibly as early as 900, and finished with the high vowels, possibly as late as c. 1300. Numerous changes occurred afterwards that are still continuing.

The following steps occurred during the Old French period:
    
Nasalization occurs before and blocks the changes  >  and  > . However, the sequence  occurs because  has more than one origin: coin "corner" < . The version without the diphthong apparently arose in unstressed environments and is the only one that survived.
Ultimately  merged into .

The following steps occurred during the Middle French period:

 Lowering of  >  > . ( usually comes from original , as original  became .)
Denasalization of vowels before  or  followed by a vowel or semi-vowel. (Examples like femme  "woman" < OF  <  and donne  "(he) gives" < OF  < , with lowering and lack of diphthongization before a nasal even when a vowel followed, show that nasalization originally operated in all environments.)

The following steps occurred during the Modern French period:

  >  >  >  ( in Quebec French). That also affects diphthongs such as  >  >  (bien  "well" < bene);  >  > , (juin  "June" < iūnium);  >  > , (coin  "corner" < cuneum). Also,  > , (pain  "bread" < pānem);  > , (plein  "full" < plēnum).
  >  > , but the  sound is maintained in Quebec French.
  >  >  ( in Quebec French)
  >  ( in Quebec French).

See also
Bartsch's law
History of French#Internal history

References

Bibliography

 Gess, Randall (1996) Optimality Theory in the Historical Phonology of French. PhD dissertation, University of Washington

French phonology

Sound laws